Noh Woong-rae (Korean: 노웅래; Hanja: 盧雄來; born 3 August 1957) is a South Korean politician serving as a member of the National Assembly that represents the Mapo A constituency. He is a member of the liberal Democratic Party of Korea. Noh is part of the anti-Moon Jae-in faction within the Democratic Party of Korea.

Early life and education 
Noh Woong-rae was born in Singongdeok-dong, Mapo-gu, Seoul, South Korea on August 3, 1957. His father Noh Seung-hwan was a member of the National Assembly from 1971 to 1992 as the representative of the Mapo-gu constituency. He has one older brother and three younger brothers. He graduated from Chung-ang University and later graduated from Dongguk University. He worked as a reporter for the Maeil Business Newspaper from 1983 to 1985. He worked as a newsroom anchor for the Munhwa Broadcasting Corporation (MBC) from 1985 to 2003. He was a union organizer for workers at MBC and for reporters in South Korea from 2001 to 2003.

Political career 
In the 2004 South Korean legislative election, Noh ran for the Mapo A constituency as a member of the Uri Party and was elected with 44.21% of the vote. He also served as the spokesperson for the Uri Party from 2006 to 2007. He ran for the same constituency in the 2008 South Korean legislative election, however came in second place and lost to Grand National Party candidate Kang Seung-gyu. In the 2012 South Korean legislative election, he ran for the Mapo A constituency once again and won with 54.25% of the vote. From 2013, he served as the Chairman of the Seoul branch of the Democratic United Party. From March 2014 to June 2014, Noh served as the Secretary-General of the New Politics Alliance for Democracy. He was elected again for the Mapo A constituency in the 2016 South Korean legislative election and also ran as a candidate for the position of floor leader of the Democratic Party of Korea but failed to pass the first round. He once again attempted to become the floor leader of the Democratic Party, but lost to pro-Moon Jae-in candidate Hong Young-pyo Most recently, Noh was elected once again for the same constituency during the 2020 South Korean legislative election.

Election results

References 

1957 births
Living people
Chung-Ang University alumni
Minjoo Party of Korea politicians
People from Seoul